Ron Eglash (born December 25, 1958 in Chestertown, Maryland) is an American who works in cybernetics, professor in the School of Information at the University of Michigan with a secondary appointment in the School of Design, and an author widely known for his work in the field of ethnomathematics, which aims to study the diverse relationships between mathematics and culture.

Work 
His research includes the use of fractal patterns in African architecture, art, and religion, and the relationships between indigenous cultures and modern technology, such as that between Native American cultural and spiritual practices and cybernetics.  He holds a bachelor's degree in cybernetics and a master's in systems engineering both at the University of California, Los Angeles, and a Ph.D. in history of consciousness at the University of California, Santa Cruz.  A Fulbright fellowship enabled his postdoctoral field research on African ethnomathematics, which was later published in the book African Fractals: Modern Computing and Indigenous Design.

Eglash has also conducted studies in teaching children math and computing through simulations of indigenous and vernacular cultural practices. He explains that the simulations do not impose math externally, but rather translate the mathematical ideas already present in the cultural practices to their equivalent form in school-taught math.  Examples include transformational geometry in cornrow braiding, spiral arcs in graffiti, least common multiples in percussion rhythms, and analytic geometry in Native American beadwork.  His approach is one of many attempts to draw the inspiration to learn out of students' own cultural backgrounds.

He also studies social justice issues as they manifest in the practice of science and technology, ranging from the ethnic identity of “nerds” to the so-called appropriation of science and technology by groups disempowered on the basis of race, class, gender.  Another branch of this research explores how the “bottom-up” egalitarian principles found in many indigenous cultures could be applied to modern society in fields from economics to political science.

He has served as a senior lecturer in comparative studies at Ohio State University, and is currently a professor at the University of Michigan, Ann Arbor.

Publications

Books
 African Fractals: Modern Computing and Indigenous Design. New Brunswick: Rutgers University Press, 1999.
 Eglash, R., Croissant, J., Di Chiro, G., and Fouché, R. (ed). Appropriating Technology: Vernacular Science and Social Power. University of Minnesota Press, 2004.
  “Race, Sex, & Nerds": In Race, Sex, and Nerds: From Black Geeks to Asian American Hipsters, Ron Eglash is challenging the normative racial identity associated to geeks and nerds. He identifies the figure of the nerd as one typically representative of hyper-whiteness. However, as the participation of underrepresented minorities in science and technology emerges, the identity of the nerd is being redesigned so Black/Asian nerds are not viewed as making efforts to cultivate a White identity.

Web

External links
 Ron Eglash's homepage
 Ron Eglash's publications
 Creating designs with African fractals
 African influence in Cybernetics
 
 Ron Eglash: The fractals at the heart of African designs (TEDGlobal 2007)
 Transformational Geometry and Iteration in Cornrow Hairstyles

1958 births
Living people
20th-century American mathematicians
Ethnomathematicians
People from Chestertown, Maryland
Rensselaer Polytechnic Institute faculty
University of California, Santa Cruz alumni
21st-century American mathematicians